No One (stylized as NO ONE) is the first mini-album by South Korean boy band, F.Cuz.  The album was released in physical and digital format on March 11, 2010.  The Taiwanese version was released on May 21, 2010; this edition includes a Mandarin version of F.Cuz's debut single "Jiggy" featuring Taiwanese entertainer Kuo Shu-yao.

Track listing

References

External links
 Official Website

2010 EPs
F.Cuz albums